Muzhiki! is a 1981 Soviet drama film directed by Iskra Babich. It was entered into the 32nd Berlin International Film Festival, where it won an Honourable Mention.

Plot
Pavel Zubov (Aleksandr Mikhajlov) lives and works in arctic Nikel. He came there thirteen years ago, just after the army, without even a glance at the road leading to his native village, where his bride Nastya was waiting for him. The fact is that at the end of the service, Pavel got a letter from his mother, from which he learned that Nastya had cheated on him and is expecting a child whose father is not known. That is why he did not come back home and stayed to work in the North.

A letter informing Pavel that his father is seriously ill forces him to visit the parents. It turns out that everything is fine with his father (he just used the letter as a trick to force his son to visit). But Nastya died recently. Pavel learns that his mother was wrong when she sent the unfortunate letter about her. Nastya loved Pavel and it was from him that she gave birth to a girl named Polina. Later, after marrying a drunkard artist, Anastasia gave birth to a son named Pavlik and also adopted Styopka, a child from a maternity hospital. Everyone thinks that Styopka is mute from birth, even though he hears perfectly, understands everything and has no physical defects which prevent him from talking. The father of Pavlik became a chronic alcoholic, and has long since left the family. The children do not have adult able-bodied family members and foster care is not given to Pavel's parents because they are elderly.

It is not easy for Pavel to decide if he can assume responsibility for the fate of not only of his biological daughter but also of the two boys.

Cast
 Aleksandr Mikhajlov as Pavel
 Pyotr Glebov as Pavel's father  
 Vera Alkhovskaya Polina mother  of Pavel
 Irina Ivanova as Polina
 Mikhail Buzylyov-Kretso as Stepan
 Pyotr Krylov as Pavlik
 Aleksandr Pavlov as Sergei
 Anatoli Solonitsyn as artist
 Mariya Andrianova as aunt Ustyusha
 Svetlana Tormakhova as Inspector of Social Services
 Leonard Varfolomeyev as chairman of the kolkhoz
 Afanasi Kochetkov as uncle Grisha
 Dmitry Buzylyov-Kretso as Arslan Asanov

References

External links

1981 films
Soviet drama films
1980s Russian-language films
1981 drama films
Films directed by Iskra Babich